Howard I. Rhine, was an American lawyer, and he also served for a while as president of National Jewish Commission on Law and Public Affairs (COLPA). Sabbath observance in work situations was among the areas he helped those who turned to COLPA for assistance. He also served as a senior vice president of the Orthodox Union.

His career included working at the Greenman, Zimet, Haines, Corbin & Goodkind law firm; Rhine testified more than once before the US Congress.

Family
Rhine left behind his wife and their three married children, their grandchildren and greatgrandchildren, and his married brother and their offspring.

References

Leaders of Jewish organizations in the United States
Jewish American community activists 
2020 deaths
21st-century American Jews